Joan Naviyuk Kane is an Inupiaq American poet. In 2014, Kane was the Indigenous Writer-in-Residence at the School for Advanced Research. She was also a judge for the 2017 Griffin Poetry Prize. Kane was awarded the John Simon Guggenheim Foundation Fellowship in 2018.

Life
Joan Kane is Inupiaq, and has family from King Island and Mary's Igloo, Alaska.  She graduated from Harvard College  with a BA and earned an M.F.A from Columbia University.

She lives in Cambridge, Massachusetts with her 2 children.

Awards
 2004 John Haines Award from Ice Floe Press
 2006 Walt Whitman Award semi-finalist by the Academy of American Poets
 2007 Rasmuson Foundation Individual Artist Award
 2009 Whiting Award
 2009 National Native Creative Development Program Longhouse Education and Cultural Center Grantee 
 2010 Alaska Native Writers on the Environment Award 
2012 Donald Hall Prize in Poetry from AWP
 2013 Native Arts and Cultures Foundation Literature Fellowship 
2013 Rasmuson Foundation Artist Fellowship
2014 Indigenous Writer-in-Residence at School for Advanced Research
2014 American Book Award for Hyperboreal
2016 Tuttle Creative Residency.
2016 Rasmuson Foundation Individual Artist Award. 
2016 Aninstantia Foundation Artist Award.
2017 Lannan Foundation Residency Fellowship. 
2018 John Simon Guggenheim Foundation Fellowship
2019 Radcliffe Institute for Advanced Study at Harvard University Fellowship

Works
 "Insomnia at North", AGNI, 3/2006
 Due North, Columbia University, 2006
 Cormorant Hunter’s Wife, NorthShore Press, 2009, ; University of Alaska Press, 2012, 

Milk Black Carbon. University of Pittsburgh Press. 2017. 
The Straits. Voices from the American Land, 2015. V.4, Issue 2
A Few Lines in the Manifest. Albion Books. 14 May 2018. 
Sublingual. Finishing Line Press. 2 November 2018. 
Another Bright Departure. CutBank Books. March 2019. .
Dark Traffic. University of Pittsburgh Press. 2021.

Play
 The Gilded Tusk, won the Anchorage Museum script contest

In Anthology
 Best American Poetry, Simon & Schuster, 2015. 
Monticello in Mind, University of Virginia Press, 2016. 
Read America(s). Locked Horns Press, 2016. 
Syncretism and Survival, Forums on Poetics. Locked Horns Press, 2017. 
Ghost Fishing: An Eco-Justice Poetry Anthology. University of Georgia Press, 2018.
The Poem's Country: Place and Poetic Practice. 2018. Pleiades Press.

References

External links
 Author's Website
Profile at The Whiting Foundation
The Cormorant Hunters Wife website

Columbia University School of the Arts alumni
Harvard College alumni
Inupiat people
Living people
Native American poets
Writers from Anchorage, Alaska
Year of birth missing (living people)
American women poets
21st-century American poets
American Book Award winners
Native American women writers
21st-century American women